Copine 7 is a protein that in humans is encoded by the CPNE7 gene.

Function

This gene encodes a member of the copine family, which is composed of calcium-dependent membrane-binding proteins. The gene product contains two N-terminal C2 domains and one von Willebrand factor A domain. The encoded protein may be involved in membrane trafficking. Two alternatively spliced transcript variants encoding different isoforms have been found for this gene.

References

Further reading